Reduced to Ashes may refer to:
Reduced to Ashes (Deeds of Flesh album), released in 2003
Reduced to Ashes (Memorain album), released in 2006
Reduced to Ashes: The Insurgency and Human Rights in Punjab, 2003 book